Surfleet railway station was a station in Surfleet, Lincolnshire, England. It closed to passenger traffic on 11 September 1961.

The rail line is now the A16 road, and no trace of the station can be found.

References

Disused railway stations in Lincolnshire
Former Great Northern Railway stations
Railway stations in Great Britain opened in 1849
Railway stations in Great Britain closed in 1961
1849 establishments in England